The Living Lakes is an international network program managed by the Global Nature Fund (GNF) to enhance the protection, restoration and rehabilitation of freshwater lakes worldwide. GNF seeks the partnership of decision makers, communities and businesses to conserve the water quality and biodiversity of these wetlands through sustainable use and development, thereby also ensuring the reservoirs of drinking water.

The Living Lakes Network currently has 29 member lakes and 27 associates.

Network members

 Lake Baikal, Russia
 Lake Balaton, Hungary
 Lake Biwa, Japan
 Lake Constance, Germany, Switzerland & Austria
 Bolgoda Lake, Sri Lanka
 Lake Chapala, Mexico
 The Broads, United Kingdom
 Columbia River Wetlands, Canada
 La Nava, Spain
 Laguna de Bay, Philippines
 Laguna Fúquene, Colombia
 Maduganga & Madampe, Sri Lanka
 Mahakam Wetland, Indonesia
 Mar Chiquita, Argentina
 Milicz Ponds, Poland

 Mono Lake, United States
 Nestos Lakes, Greece
 Paliastomi Lake, Georgia
 Pantanal, Brazil, Bolivia, Paraguay
 Peipsi / Chudskoe & Võrtsjärv, Estonia & Russia
 Poyang, China
 St. Lucia, South Africa
 Tengiz Lake, Kazakhstan
 Lake Titicaca, Bolivia & Peru
 The Dead Sea, Israel, Jordan & Palestine
 Lake Trasimeno, Italy
 Uluabat Lake, Turkey
 Lake Victoria, Kenya, Tanzania & Uganda
 Vostok, Antarctica - honorary member

Candidate members
 Laguna de Rocha, Uruguay
 Lagunita Complex, Paraguay

Associated members

 Albufera, Spain
 Amatitlan, Guatemala
 Atitlan, Guatemala
 Atotonilco, Mexico
 Bolsena, Italy
 Enriquillo & Azuéi, Dominican Republic & Haiti
 Garda, Italy
 Issyk-Kul, Kyrgyzstan
 Kolindsund, Denmark
 Labanoras, Lithuania
 Lago Maggiore, Italy
 Lake District, United Kingdom
 Mar Menor, Spain
 Mindelsee, Germany

 Okavango Delta, Botswana
 Orta, Italy
 Piediluco, Italy
 Pulicat, India
 Rio Gallegos, Argentina
 Salobrar de Campos, Spain
 Sampaloc, Philippines
 Sapanca, Turkey
 Taal, Philippines
 Uvs, Mongolia
 Vico, Italy
 Wilson Inlet, Australia
 Wular Lake, India

References

International environmental organizations